1, 2, 3, Sun is a 1993 French surrealist black comedy film directed by Bertrand Blier. The title of the film corresponds to the French name for the "Statues" children's game.

Plot
In an impoverished district of Marseille, full of tower blocks populated by people from many parts of Africa and elsewhere, Victorine is growing up with an inadequate mother and an alcoholic father, who keeps giving her half-brothers and half-sisters. She loves him nonetheless, wishing that he would give up drinking and stay home. Well aware of what puberty entails, she is being serially initiated in an abandoned car by a gang of unemployed youths when she cries out that the first time should have some affection and romance. In which case, they say, you need Petit Paul. Treating her tenderly, he becomes her first love but his career as a burglar is cut short when he is shot by an enraged householder. After exposing herself to a solitary man on a train, he declares that he has fallen in love with her. This is Maurice, whose love never wavers and who marries her.

Cast
 Anouk Grinberg as Victorine
 Myriam Boyer as Daniela Laspada (the mother)
 Olivier Martinez as Petit ("Little") Paul
  as Maurice Le Garrec
  as school teacher
 Jean-Pierre Marielle as the lonely man
 Éva Darlan as Jeanine
 Claude Brasseur as the bad guy
  as Gladys Boigny
 Patrick Bouchitey as Marcel (the barkeeper)
 Marcello Mastroianni as Constantin Laspada (the father)
  as Sergeant Boigny

Accolades
César Awards (France)
Won: Best Music (Khaled)
Won: Most Promising Actor (Olivier Martinez)
Nominated: Best Actress – Leading Role (Anouk Grinberg)
Nominated: Best Actress – Supporting Role (Myriam Boyer)
Nominated: Best Director (Bertrand Blier)
Stockholm Film Festival (Sweden)
Won: Bronze Horse (Bertrand Blier)
Venice Film Festival (Italy)
Won: Golden Osella - Best Music (Cheb Khaled)
Won: Grand Prize of the European Academy (Bertrand Blier)
Won: Volpi Cup - Best Supporting Actor (Marcello Mastroianni)

References

External links
 

1993 films
1993 drama films
1990s French-language films
Films directed by Bertrand Blier
Films set in Marseille
French drama films
Gaumont Film Company films
1990s French films